The Kali River or Kaali Nadi is a river flowing through  Uttara Kannada district of Karnataka state in India. The river rises near Kushavali, a small village in Uttar Kannada district. The river is the lifeline to some 400,000 people in the Uttara Kannada district and supports the livelihoods of tens of thousands of people including fishermen on the coast of Karwar. There are many dams built across this river for the generation of electricity. One of the important dams build across Kali river is the Supa Dam at Ganeshgudi. The river runs 184 kilometers before joining Arabian Sea.

Significant and picturesque, the Sadashivgad fort is now a popular tourist destination located by the coastal highway Kali river bridge, which has been built above the confluence of the river and the Arabian Sea.

The National Highway NH-17 continues on the Kali Bridge built over Kali River and the road continues to split the Sadashivgad granite rock hill to connect Karnataka to Goa.

In August 2019 due to excessive rains in the region it caused flooding and loss of property and animal life  due to the floods which took place when a huge amount of water was discharged on the downstream area. Many people lost their houses and moved to rehabilitation services provided by the government.

Origin and course
The Kali River has its origin near the village of Kushavali of Joida Taluka, 2011 Census Village code is 602664, in the Western Ghats and flows eastwards into the Supa Dam Reservoir, where it is joined by the Pandri River from the left (north). The Kali exits at Supa Dam near Kurandi then flows east towards Dandeli. Passing south of Dandeli, the Kali River flows southeast into the Bommanalli Reservoir, exiting at the dam and flowing east between the villages of Kegdal on the right (south) and Bommanalli on the left (north). At that point the Kali turns west and flows through a gorge which ends at Sathodi Falls below Sykes Point. Leaving that reservoir, the Kali River flows west and is joined by the Vuki Halla from the right (north). Whence it flows southwest into the Kadra Reservoir, and is joined by the Thana Halla just below the dam at Kadra. From Kadra, the Kali flows west through marshland to join the Arabian Sea near the town of Karwar. The river flows entirely through the district of Uttara Kannada.

Pollution and ecology
Treated effluents released directly into the river by industrial units and illegal sand mining in the Supa Dam area resulted in serious disturbances to the river's ecology. The government strategy for controlling the pollution from illegal sand mining has produced a cleaner river. The releases from a papermill have drawn crocodiles to the Anshi Dandeli Tiger Reserve. Chemical and petroleum companies near its estuary have been leaking toxic wastes, including mercury, into the Kali River for decades.

Television entertainment 
 Real TV's India's biggest reality show, Sarkaar Ki Duniya was shot at Mango Island Near Ambe Joog, which is an island surrounded by the Kali river in Siddar near Karwar.

See also
 List of dams and reservoirs in India
 List of rivers of India
 Karwar
 Sadashivgad

Notes

External links

 A documentary on the river by Amoghavarsha JS
Kali Nadi

Rivers of Karnataka
Rivers of the Western Ghats
Geography of Uttara Kannada district
Rivers of India

ca:Kali Nadi Occidental